Adam Hamm (born July 24, 1971) is a former North Dakota Insurance Commissioner who served from 2007 to 2016. He was appointed to the position and he began his work on October 22, 2007. Hamm is a former prosecutor in the Cass County State's Attorney's office and is a native of Jamestown. He won re-election in 2008 against challenger Jasper Schneider.

In late 2015, Hamm announced he would not seek a third term as Insurance Commissioner.

Personal life
Hamm is married to Michelle, and they have two children: Wyatt, 10, and Halle, 7.

Electoral history

References

University of North Dakota alumni
1971 births
Living people
Insurance Commissioners of North Dakota
North Dakota Republicans
People from Cass County, North Dakota
People from Jamestown, North Dakota